Rothenbach is an Ortsgemeinde – a community belonging to a Verbandsgemeinde – in the Westerwaldkreis in Rhineland-Palatinate, Germany.

Geography
Rothenbach lies 8 km west of Westerburg. Since 1972 it has belonged to what was then the newly founded Verbandsgemeinde of Westerburg, a kind of collective municipality. Its seat is in Westerburg.

Rothenbach's Ortsteile are Rothenbach, Obersayn and Himburg.

Politics
The council is made up of 13 council members, including the mayor (Bürgermeister), who were elected in a municipal election on 7 June 2009.

Economy and infrastructure

Right through the community runs Bundesstraße 255, leading from Montabaur to Herborn. The nearest Autobahn interchange is Montabaur on the A 3 (Cologne–Frankfurt). The nearest InterCityExpress stop is the railway station at Montabaur on the Cologne-Frankfurt high-speed rail line.

References

External links
 Rothenbach in the collective municipality’s Web pages 

Municipalities in Rhineland-Palatinate
Westerwaldkreis